Handle with Care may refer to:

Film and television
 Handle with Care (1922 film), an American silent film by Phil Rosen
 Handle with Care (1932 film), an American pre-Code film by David Butler
 Handle with Care (1935 film), a British comedy by Randall Faye
 Handle with Care (1958 film), an American film by David Friedkin
 Handle with Care (1977 film), an American comedy by Jonathan Demme
 Handle with Care (1985 film), an Australian telefilm by Paul Cox
 "Handle with Care" (The Vampire Diaries), a 2013 episode of The Vampire Diaries
 Handle with Care (Fear the Walking Dead), an episode of the television series Fear the Walking Dead

Music

Albums
 Handle with Care (Clarke-Boland Big Band album) (1963)
 Handle with Care (Natalie Lauren album)
 Handle with Care (Nuclear Assault album) (1989)
 Handle with Care, a 2001 album by Johnny Jenkins

Songs
 "Handle with Care" (song), a 1988 song by the Traveling Wilburys
 "Handle with Care", a 1966 song by Teresa Brewer
 "Handle with Care", a 2015 song by Kid Cudi from Speedin' Bullet 2 Heaven

Other uses
 Handle with Care (novel), a 2009 novel by Jodi Picoult